Ahmad Monshizadeh (born 23 June 1944) is a retired Iranian professional footballer. He is the first goalscorer in Tehran derby.

References

1944 births
Living people
Sportspeople from Tehran
Iranian footballers
Esteghlal F.C. players
Association football midfielders